Roystonea altissima is a species of palm which is endemic to  hillsides and mountain slopes near the interior of Jamaica. The name altissima is Latin for "highest", however they are not the tallest species in the genus Roystonea.

Description
Individuals have about 15 leaves with  rachises; the leaves hang well horizontal. The  inflorescences bear violet male and female flowers.

Taxonomy
Roystonea is placed in the subfamily Arecoideae and the tribe Roystoneae.  The placement Roystonea within the Arecoideae is uncertain; a phylogeny based on plastid DNA failed to resolve the position of the genus within the Arecoideae.  As of 2008, there appear to be no molecular phylogenetic studies of Roystonea and the relationship between R. altissima and the rest of the genus is uncertain.

The species was first described by Scottish botanist Philip Miller as Palma altissima.  The species was largely overlooked for the next 180 years until American botanist Liberty Hyde Bailey took a look at the royal palms as a whole.  Apparently unaware of Miller's description, Bailey applied a new name, Roystonea jamaicana, to the species.  In 1963 Harold E. Moore synonymised Bailey's species with Miller's and proposed a new combination, R. altissima.

Common names
Roystonea altissima is known as the "Jamaican cabbage tree", "Jamaican royal palm" or the "mountain cabbage palm".

References

Riffle, Robert L. and Craft, Paul (2003) An Encyclopedia of Cultivated Palms. Portland: Timber Press.  /  (Page 441-442)

Trees of Jamaica
altissima